Ernst Gutting (January 30, 1919 – September 27, 2013) was a German prelate of the Roman Catholic Church. As of 2013 he was the oldest German Roman Catholic bishop.

Gutting was born in Ludwigshafen, Germany, and was ordained a priest on July 3, 1949. Gutting was appointed auxiliary bishop of the Diocese of Speyer, as well as titular bishop of Sufar, on May 31, 1971 and ordained a bishop on September 12, 1971. Gutting retired as auxiliary bishop of the Diocese of Speyer on February 24, 1994.

External links

Diocese Site 

1919 births
2013 deaths
German prisoners of war in World War II
20th-century German Roman Catholic bishops
German Roman Catholic titular bishops
20th-century German Roman Catholic priests